Sāyā is the type of poem or song that a Takam-Chi chants while playing a Takam. The words Sāyā, Takam and Takam-Chi are Azari words.

References
 The Anthropological Museum of the Tribes of Azarbaijan, Sarāb, English, Persian.

Persian poems